William McGuire (born 24 March 1860) was a Scottish footballer who played as a centre forward.

Career
Born in Beith, McGuire played club football for Beith Thistle, Beith and Darwen, and made two appearances for Scotland in 1881 (a 6–1 victory over England and a 5–1 win against Wales). He was the only serving Beith player to have been selected for international duty. Injuries during his spell in England with Darwen brought his playing career to an end in 1883.

References

1860 births
1925 deaths
Scottish footballers
Scotland international footballers
Beith F.C. players
Darwen F.C. players
Association football forwards
Footballers from North Ayrshire
People from Beith